Timur Abdurashitovich Zhamaletdinov (born 21 May 1997) is a Russian professional footballer who plays as a striker for FC SKA-Khabarovsk.

Club career
He made his debut for the main squad of PFC CSKA Moscow in the Russian Cup game against FC Yenisey Krasnoyarsk on 21 September 2016.

He made his Russian Premier League debut for CSKA on 9 April 2017 in a game against FC Krasnodar.

On 12 September 2017, he scored a winning goal in CSKA's 2–1 away victory over Benfica in the 2017–18 UEFA Champions League group stage.

On 15 September 2018, he scored twice in a 3–0 league victory over FC Ufa after replacing Hörður Björgvin Magnússon in the middle of the first half due to Hörður's injury.

On 25 January 2019, he joined Polish club Lech Poznań on loan until the end of the 2018–19 season, with Lech also holding an option to purchase his rights at the end of the season. On 14 June 2019, he extended his contract with PFC CSKA Moscow until the end of the 2020–21 season and was loaned to Lech again for the 2019–20 season.

On 12 August 2020, he moved to FC Ufa.

Career statistics

Club

Honours

Club
CSKA Moscow
Russian Super Cup: 2018

References

External links
 

1997 births
Footballers from Moscow
Living people
Russian footballers
Russia youth international footballers
Russia under-21 international footballers
Association football forwards
PFC CSKA Moscow players
Lech Poznań players
Lech Poznań II players
FC Ufa players
FC SKA-Khabarovsk players
Russian Premier League players
Ekstraklasa players
II liga players
III liga players
Russian First League players
Russian expatriate footballers
Expatriate footballers in Poland
Russian expatriate sportspeople in Poland